The 1950 Stanford Indians football team represented Stanford University in the 1950 college football season. Stanford was led by sixth-year head coach Marchmont Schwartz.  The team were members of the Pacific Coast Conference and played their home games at Stanford Stadium in Stanford, California.

Coming off the successful 1949 season in which a talented group of sophomores, led by quarterback Gary Kerkorian and end Bill McColl, had the Indians a game away from the Rose Bowl, Stanford was expected to have an excellent season and was ranked 7th in the first-ever preseason AP Poll. But after starting 4–0, the team would only win one more game and tie twice, the second tie coming in the Big Game, in which the team rallied to tie undefeated and Rose Bowl-bound rival California. Coach Schwartz resigned following the season.

Schedule

Players drafted by the NFL

References

Stanford
Stanford Cardinal football seasons
Stanford Indians football